Chaoyang Township (朝阳乡) could refer to a number of townships in the People's Republic of China:

Chaoyang Township, Xiuyan County, in Xiuyan Manchu Autonomous County, Liaoning
Chaoyang Township, Dehui, in Jilin
Chaoyang Township, Baoqing County, in Heilongjiang
Chaoyang Township, Zhaozhou County, in Heilongjiang
Chaoyang Township, Shuangcheng, in Heilongjiang
Chaoyang Township, Wudalianchi, in Heilongjiang
Chaoyang Township, Pingyang County, in Zhejiang
Chaoyang Township, Shangrao, in Xinzhou District, Shangrao, Jiangxi
Chaoyang Township, Cili County, in Hunan
Chaoyang Township, Dachu County, in Sichuan
Chaoyang Township, Guangyuan, in Yuanba District, Guangyuan Sichuan
Chaoyang Township, Yuechi County, in Sichuan
Chaoyang Township, Anyue County, in Sichuan
Chaoyang Township, Guilin, in Qixing District, Guilin, Guangxi

Township name disambiguation pages